Richard Jackson Nesbitt (November 14, 1907 – March 5, 1962) was a professional American football player who played running back for five seasons for the Chicago Bears, Chicago Cardinals, and Brooklyn Dodgers.

Nesbitt worked as sports anchor for KSTP-TV, St. Paul/Minneapolis, MN until his death in 1962.

External links 
 

1907 births
American football running backs
Chicago Bears players
Chicago Cardinals players
Brooklyn Dodgers (NFL) players
Drake Bulldogs football players
1962 deaths
Players of American football from Des Moines, Iowa
Theodore Roosevelt High School (Iowa) alumni